David Silverman may refer to:

David Silverman (animator) (born 1957), American animator and director
David Silverman (activist) (born 1966), American activist and former president of American Atheists
 David Silverman, a mathematician known for Silverman's game
David P. Silverman, American Egyptologist